David James Noble (born 2 February 1982) is a  football manager and former player, playing as a midfielder. He is currently the head coach of  St Albans City.   

Noble made more than 300 appearances in the Football League for Watford, West Ham United, Boston United, Bristol City, Yeovil Town, Exeter City, Rotherham United, Cheltenham Town and Oldham Athletic. Internationally, he represented his native England at levels up to under-20 before playing under-21 and B international football for Scotland.

Club career

Arsenal 
Noble was born in Hitchin, Hertfordshire. His career began as a trainee at Arsenal, with whom he won the FA Youth Cup in 2000. His first senior appearance was on loan at Watford in the 2001–02 season, under the management of Gianluca Vialli; where he scored once against Grimsby Town.

West Ham United 
In February 2003, Noble joined newly relegated West Ham United on a free transfer, signing a deal until the end of the 2003–04 season. He made his debut in a League Cup game against Rushden & Diamonds on 13 August 2003, playing the full 90 minutes of a 3–1 win, but found chances limited and made three League appearances as substitute in August and September.

Boston United 
In February 2004, Noble was loaned for a month to Boston United, after which he signed a permanent contract, initially until the end of the season.

Bristol City 
In January 2006, he moved to Bristol City for £80,000, after enjoying a successful loan spell there. On 13 February 2007, he scored against Middlesbrough in the FA Cup fourth round replay, but his most important strikes were the two goals he scored against Rotherham United on 5 May which took City back into the Championship.

Noble also scored in the Championship play-off semi-final against Crystal Palace the following year, when his stoppage-time strike from  gave Bristol City the advantage going into the second leg.

He joined Yeovil Town on loan on 25 March 2009, before being released at the end of the season.

Exeter City 
On 4 January 2010, Noble signed for League One side Exeter City. Noble was named as the club's captain for the 2010–11 season. He signed a new one-year contract in June 2011. In May 2012, Noble was released by Exeter after the club was relegated.

Rotherham United 
Noble signed for Rotherham United on 13 July 2012. He joined Cheltenham Town on loan in September 2013.

Oldham Athletic and return to Exeter City 
Noble joined Oldham Athletic on non-contract terms in August 2014. He played twice before being released, was re-signed, and joined Exeter City on loan in September. He made 12 appearances while on loan, and then re-signed for Exeter in January 2015 until the end of the season.

St Albans City 
On 28 August 2016, Noble joined St Albans City of the National League South. He signed an 18-month contract with the Saints in December 2016 and in March 2017 became the club captain. In November 2017, he also became a coach at the club.

Following the sacking of Ian Allinson as manager of St Albans City in September 2022, Noble took on the Interim Head Coach role. On 19 November 2022, Noble was given the role on a permanent basis following a 55% win rate across his interim spell in charge.

International career 
Noble represented his native England at under-16, under-19, and under-20 levels. He then switched to play for Scotland. He made two appearances at under-21 level, and also played in a Scotland future team match against Turkey B on 25 February 2003.

Career statistics

Honours 
Arsenal
 FA Youth Cup: 2000

Bristol City
 League One runners-up: 2006–07

Rotherham United
 League Two runners-up: 2012–13

References

External links

1982 births
Living people
Sportspeople from Hitchin
Footballers from Hertfordshire
Association football midfielders
English footballers
England youth international footballers
Scottish footballers
Scotland under-21 international footballers
Scotland B international footballers
Arsenal F.C. players
Watford F.C. players
Boston United F.C. players
West Ham United F.C. players
Bristol City F.C. players
Yeovil Town F.C. players
Exeter City F.C. players
Rotherham United F.C. players
Cheltenham Town F.C. players
Oldham Athletic A.F.C. players
St Albans City F.C. players
English Football League players
National League (English football) players
English people of Scottish descent
St Albans City F.C. managers
National League (English football) managers